Charkhari is a city in Mahoba district in the state of Uttar Pradesh, India. This is the Kashmir of Bundelkhand. It was the capital of the Charkhari concession. There are lakes named Vijay Sagar, Malkhan Sagar, Vanshi Sagar, Jai Sagar, Ratan Sagar and Kothi Tal. There are 108 temples of Krishna giving the nature and beauty of Vraj to Charkhari city. In which Gopal Bihari temple of Sudamapuri, Guman Bihari of Ryanpur, temple of Mangalgarh, Bakht Bihari, temple of Banke Bihari and cave of Madavya Rishi are there. It is also the headquarters of Charkhari Tehsil and the name of Legislative Assembly seat is also Charkhari. Legislative Assembly constituency.

Geography
It has an average elevation of 184 metres (603 feet). Charkhari is also known as the 'Kashmir of Bundelkhand'. The town is surrounded by many lakes. There are lakes named Vijay Sagar, Malkhan Sagar, Vanshi Sagar, Jai Sagar, Ratan Sagar and Kothi Tal.

History

Charkhari State was one of the Princely states of India during the period of the British Raj. The state was founded in 1765 by Bijai Bahadur, a Rajput of Bundela clan. On India's independence, this Princely state was acceded to India.

Demographics
 India census, Charkhari had a population of 27,760. Males constitute 53% of the population and females 47%. Charkhari has an average literacy rate of 58%, lower than the national average of 59.5%; with male literacy of 68% and female literacy of 47%. 16% of the population is under 6 years of age.

References

External links

Cities and towns in Mahoba district
Bundelkhand